Nelson Keith Burton (born November 6, 1957) is a Canadian former professional National Hockey League left wing. He was selected by the Washington Capitals in the fourth round (57th overall) of the 1977 NHL Entry Draft.

Early life 
Burton was born in Sydney, Nova Scotia. He played junior hockey in the QMJHL with the Hull Festivals and the Quebec Remparts.

Career 
Nelson played only eight games in the NHL, spending the balance of his career in the minor leagues. He scored one career NHL goal against future Hall of Famer Tony Esposito. He played mainly in the AHL with the Hershey Bears, Nova Scotia Voyageurs, Syracuse Firebirds, and Baltimore Skipjacks. He has been involved in Youth Hockey programs in Maryland for many years. He was also the coach for the Maryland Terrapins Men's Hockey Team. He now runs Nelson Hockey, a developmental youth hockey organization.

Career statistics

External links
Profile at hockeydraftcentral.com

Nelson Hockey Association

1957 births
Living people
Baltimore Skipjacks players
Canadian ice hockey left wingers
Erie Blades players
Erie Golden Blades players
Hershey Bears players
Hull Festivals players
Nashville South Stars players
Nova Scotia Voyageurs players
Sportspeople from the Cape Breton Regional Municipality
People from Sydney, Nova Scotia
Quebec Remparts players
Syracuse Firebirds players
Washington Capitals draft picks
Washington Capitals players
Ice hockey people from Nova Scotia